Headspace is the first and only album from the Canadian group Pulse Ultra. The album was released on July 16, 2002, via Atlantic Records. A music video was made for the single "Build your Cages".

Reception
CMJ New Music Report wrote in 2002, "Founded in Montreal in 1997, Pulse Ultra is an aggressive, yet melodic rock band that interestingly toys with prog à la Tool, but never loses focus on keeping its songs short and to the point. "Big Brother", the album's first official single, will please anyone who got off on the moody industrial tinges of A Perfect Circle's "Thinking of You", while "Glass Door" is a full-throttle rocker in the style of Ultraspank."  Brian O'Neill of Allmusic gave the album a mixed review, stating, "The Montreal-based outfit borrows heavily from the more avant-garde styles of Tool ("Put It Off"), and other moments are more firmly rap-metal in nature ("Void" could be Incubus). While there's nothing wrong with drawing from many different sources—to be sure, the best music usually does—you still can't help but think of one thing when listening to Headspace: contrived."

Track listing
 "Acceptance (Phase I)" – 2:55
 "Finding My Place (Phase II)" – 3:47
 "Put It Off" – 3:39
 "Big Brother" (featuring Stephen Richards) – 3:21
 "Never the Culprit" – 4:06
 "Slip in Sin" – 5:02
 "Prelude" – 1:10
 "Void" – 4:01
 "Build Your Cages" – 3:54
 "Tired" – 3:24
 "Interlude" – 1:23
 "Look Closer" – 3:52
 "Glass Door" – 3:38
 "Despot" – 4:49

Personnel

Pulse Ultra
 Zo Vizza – lead vocals
 Jeff Feldman – bass guitar
 Maxx Zinno – drums
 Dominic Cifarelli – lead guitar

Additional personnel
Neal Avron – producer
Chris Lord-Alge – mixing
 Stephen Richards of Taproot - Guest vocals in "Big Brother".

References

2002 debut albums
Pulse Ultra albums
Atlantic Records albums
Albums produced by Neal Avron